The Type 142 Zobel class was a German class of torpedo bearing fast attack craft (torpedo boats). They were in service with the Bundesmarine during the Cold War to protect the Baltic sea coast. The class was designed by Lürssen.

The Zobel class was replaced by the Type 143A Gepard class, they were the last fast attack craft with only torpedoes as main armament, all later classes have anti-ship missiles.

The  of the Turkish Navy is an advanced version of the Zobel class; vessels of this class are armed with Penguin anti-ship missiles and mines in addition to torpedoes.

List of ships

In service with the Bundesmarine, the vessels belonged to the 7. Schnellbootgeschwader (7th Fast attack craft squadron) based in Kiel at the Baltic Sea.

References

External links
 Schnellboot Typ 142 Zobel-Klasse @ schnellboot.net (in German)
 Type 142 Zobel Class @ Warships On The Web

Torpedo boat classes
Torpedo boats of the German Navy
Torpedo boats of Germany
Torpedo boats of the Turkish Navy
Lürssen